The Bundesstraße 11 (abbr. B11)  is a German federal highway. It is the first regional federal highway in the German federal highway numbering system and leads from the Czech border near Bayerisch Eisenstein past Deggendorf, Landshut and Munich to Krün near Garmisch-Partenkirchen, where it connects to the Bundesstraße 2.

Between Deggendorf and Ergolding, the Bundesstraße 11 has been replaced by the Bundesautobahn 92. Northward, the road originally went over the Ruselabsatz, a  mountain pass. This strip of road was characterized by steep ascents and in winter the road was often impassable, especially for trucks. Due to this, the road has been rerouted to the west, where it is passable all year round.

See also 
Wolfratshauser Straße

011

Buildings and structures in Freising (district)